The College Football All-America Team is an honorific college football all-star team compiled after each NCAA Division I Football Bowl Subdivision (FBS) season to recognize that season's most outstanding performers at their respective positions. There are several organizations that select their own All-America teams. Since 1924, the NCAA has designated selectors whose teams are used to determine "consensus" and "unanimous" All-Americans. Any player who is named to the first team by at least half the official selectors for a given season is recognized as being a consensus All-American. Since 2002, the five selectors designated by the NCAA for this purpose are the Associated Press (AP), the American Football Coaches Association (AFCA), the Football Writers Association of America (FWAA), Sporting News, and the Walter Camp Football Foundation (WCFF).

Unanimous All-Americans are considered "elite, the cream of the crop from any particular season." Many are later inducted into the College Football Hall of Fame, and many also go on to have successful professional football careers. From 1924 to 2000, 364 players were unanimous selections at least once. Thus, only a handful of players—if any—each season receive the honor. The first player to do so was Red Grange, star halfback for the Illinois Fighting Illini, who received first-team honors from all six major selectors in 1924.

Alabama has the most unanimous All-America selections of any school with 41 selections. In 2020, Alabama tied a record set in 2003 by University of Oklahoma with five unanimous selections in one year. Eighty-nine schools have had at least one unanimous All-America selection; the most recent schools to produce their first unanimous All-American is Cincinnati and Northwestern, doing so in 2022. The most recent All-America team, that of 2022, included 14 unanimous selections. Only 29 players have been selected a unanimous All-American in multiple seasons, the most recent being Will Anderson Jr. of Alabama in 2021 and 2022. Herschel Walker is the only three-time unanimous All-American.

Key

List

Unanimous selections by school

 Alabama: 41
 Ohio State: 37
 Notre Dame: 35
 Oklahoma: 35
 USC: 29
 Michigan: 27
 Texas: 25
 Nebraska: 22
 Miami (FL): 16
 Florida State: 15
 Pittsburgh: 15
 Georgia: 15
 Penn State: 14
 Tennessee: 14
 Iowa: 13
 LSU: 12
 UCLA: 12
 Wisconsin: 12
 Michigan State: 11
 Baylor: 10
 Stanford: 10
 Arkansas: 9
 Auburn: 9
 Texas A&M: 9
 Army: 8
 Florida: 8
 Illinois: 8
 Minnesota: 8
 Oklahoma State: 8
 Syracuse: 8
 Purdue: 7
 TCU: 7
 Arizona: 6
 BYU: 6
 Clemson: 6
 Navy: 6
 Texas Tech: 6
 Colorado: 5
 Maryland: 5
 Ole Miss: 5
 Washington: 5
 Oregon: 4
 Utah: 4
 Virginia Tech: 4
 West Virginia: 4
 Arizona State: 3
 Boston College: 3
 California: 3
 Georgia Tech: 3
 Indiana: 3
 Kentucky: 3
 Louisville: 3
 North Carolina: 3
 NC State: 3
 San Diego State: 3
 SMU: 3
 Vanderbilt: 3
 Virginia: 3
 Air Force: 2
 Cornell: 2
 Duke: 2
 Harvard: 2
 Kansas State: 2
 Missouri: 2
 Oregon State: 2
 South Carolina: 2
 Tulsa: 2
 Wake Forest: 2
 Washington State: 2
 Yale: 2
 Chicago: 1
 Cincinnati: 1
 Colorado State: 1
 Dartmouth: 1
 East Carolina: 1
 Florida Atlantic: 1
 Fresno State: 1
 Iowa State: 1
 Kansas: 1
 Louisiana Tech: 1
 Marshall: 1
 Northern Illinois: 1 
 Northwestern: 1
 Penn: 1
 Princeton: 1
 Rutgers: 1
 Saint Mary's: 1
 Temple: 1
 Tulane: 1
 UTEP: 1

Notes

References
General
 

 
 
 
 
 
 
 
 
 
 

Footnotes

Unanimous